Vladislav Kulikov (born 7 January 1971) is a former butterfly swimmer from Russia, who won the bronze medal in the men's 200 m butterfly at the 1996 Summer Olympics in Atlanta, Georgia. He also competed at the Barcelona Games (1992), as a member of the Unified Team.

External links
 
 

Russian male swimmers
Olympic swimmers of the Unified Team
Olympic swimmers of Russia
Male butterfly swimmers
Swimmers at the 1992 Summer Olympics
Swimmers at the 1996 Summer Olympics
Olympic silver medalists for the Unified Team
Olympic silver medalists for Russia
Olympic bronze medalists for Russia
1971 births
Living people
Place of birth missing (living people)
Olympic bronze medalists in swimming
Russian male freestyle swimmers
World Aquatics Championships medalists in swimming
Medalists at the FINA World Swimming Championships (25 m)
European Aquatics Championships medalists in swimming
Medalists at the 1996 Summer Olympics
Medalists at the 1992 Summer Olympics
Olympic silver medalists in swimming
Goodwill Games medalists in swimming
Competitors at the 1998 Goodwill Games